Salvador Imperatore Marcone (born 11 March 1950) is a Chilean former football referee. He officiated the opening match at the 1991 FIFA Women's World Cup, as well as the semi final between the United States and Germany. He was later on call as a reserve official for the 1994 FIFA World Cup.

Imperatore also refereed at the 1993 FIFA U-17 World Championship, the 1995 Copa América and the 1995 King Fahd Cup. A chemical engineer by trade, Imperatore suffered a stroke in 2008.

References

External links
profile at WorldReferee.com

1950 births
Chilean football referees
Chilean people of Italian descent
Living people
FIFA Women's World Cup referees
Chilean chemists